Atriplex angulata, the fan saltbush, is a species of flowering plant in the family Amaranthaceae, native to central and eastern Australia. This species has high variability in its bracteole and leaf shapes and textures, and is typically found growing in deserts or dry shrublands.

References

angulata
Endemic flora of Australia
Flora of the Northern Territory
Flora of South Australia
Flora of Queensland
Flora of New South Wales
Flora of Victoria (Australia)
Plants described in 1870